Sulcophanaeus imperator is a species of beetles belonging to the family Scarabaeidae.

Subspecies
 Sulcophanaeus imperator imperator (Chevrolat, 1844)
 Sulcophanaeus imperator alticollis Arnaud, 2002
 Sulcophanaeus imperator obscurus Arnaud, 2002

Description
Pronotum is black with a large shining coppery red band, while elytra are blueish-black. On the sides of the head there are two large iridescent orange-red spots similar to eyes. Males have a long, curved horn on the forehead. It is a diurnal, coprophagous species.

Distribution and habitat

Gallery

References

 Solier A.J.J. (1851) Zoologia: Coleopteros. In Gay C.: Historia fisica y politica de Chile segun documentos adquiridos en esta republica durante doce anos de residencia en ella, Paris 5:1-285 (38-124)
 Scarabs: World Scarabaeidae Database. Schoolmeesters P.
 Guérin-Méneville F.E.. Iconographie du Règne Animal de G.Cuvier. Part 7. Insectes. Paris:Ballière (1829-1844) 7:1-576, 1844.

Scarabaeidae
Beetles described in 1844